Otreshkovo is a rural locality in Vinnikovsky Selsoviet Rural Settlement, Kursky District, Kursk Oblast, Russia. Population:

Geography 
The village is located 112 km from the Russia–Ukraine border, 18 km north-east of the district center – the town Kursk, 3 km from the selsoviet center – 1st Vinnikovo.

 Climate
Otreshkovo has a warm-summer humid continental climate (Dfb in the Köppen climate classification).

Transport 
Otreshkovo is located 8.5 km from the federal route  (Kursk – Voronezh –  "Kaspy" Highway; a part of the European route ), on the road of regional importance  (Kursk – Kastornoye), on the road of intermunicipal significance  (38K-016 – 1st Vinnikovo – Lipovets, with the access road to Malinovy), in the vicinity of the railway station Otreshkovo (railway line Kursk – 146 km).

The rural locality is situated 16 km from Kursk Vostochny Airport, 126 km from Belgorod International Airport and 188 km from Voronezh Peter the Great Airport.

References

Notes

Sources

Rural localities in Kursky District, Kursk Oblast